Masroor Nawaz Jhangvi is a Pakistani Islamic cleric and politician who was a member of the Punjab Assembly from January 2017 to May 2018. He is a son of slain Sipah-e-Sahaba founder Haq Nawaz Jhangvi.

Political career 
Masroor was elected as the member of the Punjab Assembly as independent later join Jamiat Ulema-e-Islam (F), elected from PP-78 (Jhang II) in by-polls election held in December 2016.

He was being supported by the Ahl-e-Sunnat Wal Jamaat (ASWJ).

Award 
Jhangvi received a peace award from federal Minister for Religious Affairs Sardar Muhammad Yousaf at a national conference of peace held in Islamabad.

References 

Living people
Deobandis
Politicians from Punjab, Pakistan
Punjabi people
Jamiat Ulema-e-Islam (F) politicians
Punjab MPAs 2013–2018
People from Jhang District
1988 births
Pakistani far-right politicians